Euro-Asia Air is an airline based in Atyrau, Kazakhstan. It operates mainly charter passenger services to Russia, United Arab Emirates, Turkey and within the Asian republics. Its main base is Atyrau Airport.

History 
The airline started operations in May 1997. In November 2000, Atyrau Airways and Atyrau Airport were transferred to the ownership of Euro-Asia Air. The airline is now wholly owned by KazMunayGas and has 412 employees (at March 2017).

The main activities of the company are rendering services for air transportation to legal entities and individuals. Performing flights for the development and development of mineral deposits, servicing oil pipelines, gas pipelines and power lines
"Euro-Asia Air" is the largest airline in Kazakhstan, specializing in helicopter operations and passenger transportation. Operating in accordance with international safety standards. The company operates a fleet of helicopter equipment of Russian and Western production and a fleet of passenger aircraft equipped with modern on-board equipment. The aircraft fleet consists of 19 aircraft, including: 11 Mi-8T helicopters (RF); 2 helicopters of model AS-365N3 (France); 2 Challenger-850 and Challenger-870 aircraft (Canada); 4 helicopters model Augusta Westland-139 (Italy).

Fleet

Current fleet
The Euro-Asia Air fleet includes the following aircraft (as of August 2019):

Former fleet
The airline fleet included the following aircraft as of November 2012:

References

External links

Airlines of Kazakhstan
Airlines established in 1997
Airlines formerly banned in the European Union